James Buchanan Busey IV (born October 7, 1932) is a former American government official and retired four-star admiral of the United States Navy. He served as Vice Chief of Naval Operations, from 1985 to 1987 and as Commander in Chief, United States Naval Forces Europe/Commander in Chief, Allied Forces Southern Europe from 1987 to 1989.

Early years
James Buchanan Busey IV was born on October 7, 1932, in the city of Peoria, Illinois, son of James Buchanan Busey III and Louise (née Rogers). In January 1952, Busey entered the United States Navy and attended the basic training at Boot Camp of Naval Station Great Lakes, Illinois. In March 1953, Busey was chosen to Aviation Cadet Training Program at Pensacola, Florida.

During the years 1967, Busey served at various Naval posts, including Naval Air Station Cecil Field or Naval Air Station Jacksonville. In July 1964, Busey attended the Naval Postgraduate School in Monterey, California and earned there his Bachelor of Science and Master of Business Administration degrees.

Vietnam War

In January 1967, Busey was transferred to the Attack Squadron 163 ("Saints") and served as a pilot in Vietnam War. During combat near Hanoi, North Vietnam, Busey commanded the group of six aircraft with the task of bombing the Hanoi thermal power plant.

Despite the damage of Busey's aircraft by North Vietnamese Anti-Aircraft guns, he regained control of his plane and continued his mission. For this action, Busey received the Navy Cross.

Busey's other decorations from Vietnam War included the Legion of Merit with "V" Device, three Distinguished Flying Crosses, Air Medal and Bronze Star Medal with "V" Device.

Retirement
After retiring from the navy, Busey served as the chief administrator of the Federal Aviation Administration from 1989 to 1991. He then served as United States Deputy Secretary of Transportation from 1991 to 1992. Afterwards, he became a board member at Curtiss-Wright until 2008.

Personal life
Busey married Jean L. Cole. Their children are: 
James Buchanan Busey V (1962-2008), chief engineer of unmanned aerial vehicle testing at the Naval Air Test Center, Naval Air Station, Patuxent River, Maryland, and member of the National Transportation Safety Board; with his wife, Charlotte (m. 1992) father of James Buchanan Busey VI and of Jessica Lynn Busey.
Angela R. B. Busey, married to Michael Presto, of Fresno, CA; mother of Rose.
Nancy J. B. Busey, married to Dennis Naumann, of Grass Valley, CA; mother of Cole.

Awards

References

External links
Biographic information

1932 births
Living people
United States Navy admirals
Recipients of the Navy Cross (United States)
Recipients of the Distinguished Flying Cross (United States)
Recipients of the Legion of Merit
United States Navy personnel of the Vietnam War
United States Naval Aviators
Administrators of the Federal Aviation Administration
Vice Chiefs of Naval Operations
Recipients of the Defense Distinguished Service Medal
Recipients of the Navy Distinguished Service Medal
Recipients of the Distinguished Service Order (Vietnam)
United States Deputy Secretaries of Transportation
George H. W. Bush administration personnel